Kalamazoo Roller Derby (KRD) is a women's flat track roller derby league based in Kalamazoo, Michigan. Founded in 2006, the league consists of two teams which compete against teams from other leagues, and is a member of the Women's Flat Track Derby Association (WFTDA).

History and organization

The league was founded in early 2006 as the Kalamazoo Kamikazes, and played its first bout the following year. 

By 2008 they had rebranded as the Killmazoo Derby Darlins and moved from the RollerWorld roller rink to Wings Stadium where they sold out all 800 advance tickets for a June game. It doubled its membership in 2009, following the release of the movie Whip It!.

Killamazoo was accepted into the Women's Flat Track Derby Association Apprentice Program in October 2009, and became a full member of the WFTDA in September 2010.

The league plays its bouts at the Wings Stadium, and aims in particular to attract families to watch.

In January 2018 the league announced a rebrand as Kalamazoo Derby Darlins.

In December 2020, the league announced a rebrand as Kalamazoo Roller Derby in a move to embrace diversity and inclusion.

WFTDA competition
In 2013, Killamazoo qualified for WFTDA Playoffs for the first time, participating at the Division 2 tournament they hosted at Wings Stadium. Killamazoo was the third seed and finished the tournament in third place with a 250-219 victory over NEO Roller Derby (Akron, Ohio). In 2014, KDD again qualified for Division 2 Playoffs, and were the fourth seed at Kitchener-Waterloo, Ontario, and won the third place game 180-162 over Gold Coast Derby Grrls of Fort Lauderdale.

References

Sports in Kalamazoo, Michigan
Roller derby leagues established in 2006
Roller derby leagues in Michigan
2006 establishments in Michigan